Ian Miller may refer to:

Ian Miller (Australian footballer) (born 1949), Australian rules footballer
Ian Miller (footballer, born 1983), English footballer
Ian Miller (footballer, born 1955), Scottish footballer
Ian Miller (illustrator) (born 1946), British fantasy illustrator
Ian Miller, former member of the band Virgin Black
Ian Miller, Commandant (Chief Officer), of the City of London Police Special Constabulary
Ian Miller (basketball) (born 1991), American basketball player
Ian Miller (baseball), baseball player
Ian Miller, a character in the film My Big Fat Greek Wedding
Ian Miller, co-founder of Miller's Retail

See also
Ian Millar (born 1947), Canadian show jumper